Ira Ellsworth Robinson (September 16, 1869, near Grafton, Taylor County, West Virginia – October 28, 1951, Philippi, West Virginia) was a politician, judge, and the first chairman of the Federal Radio Commission (1928-32).

Biography
Robinson graduated from the Fairmont State Normal School in 1889 and then studied law, being admitted to the bar in 1891. From 1896 to 1900, he was the Taylor County prosecuting attorney. He was a member of the Board of Regents of the State Normal School system from 1901-07. Robinson was elected to the West Virginia Senate for the 1903-04 session and was then appointed to the Supreme Court of Appeals of West Virginia in 1907, being elected in 1908 to the remainder of the unexpired term (through 1915).

In 1916, Robinson was the Republican nominee for governor of West Virginia, losing by a narrow margin to Democrat John J. Cornwell. In 1917-18, he served as the chairman of the draft board for northern West Virginia. In 1921, he was put in charge of administration of the federal War Minerals Relief Act.

In 1920, Robinson purchased an 1870 mansion in Barbour County which he renamed Adaland Mansion after his wife; it is now a museum.  It was listed on the National Register of Historic Places in 1995.

In 1928, Robinson was appointed to the Federal Radio Commission and became its first chairman; he resigned in January 1932. He presided over the 1928 reallocation known as General Order 40, although he opposed it as too favorable to network radio stations. He helped mold much of the early regulation of radio in the US.

Robinson was forced to sell Adaland later in life and died in considerable financial difficulties. He is buried in Bluemont Cemetery in his birthplace of Grafton, West Virginia.

References

External Links
The West Virginia & Regional History Center at West Virginia University houses the papers of Ira E. Robinson in three collections, A&M 155, A&M 294, and A&M 965

1869 births
1951 deaths
19th-century American lawyers
20th-century American lawyers
20th-century American judges
20th-century American politicians
County prosecuting attorneys in West Virginia
Fairmont State University alumni
Justices of the Supreme Court of Appeals of West Virginia
Members of the Federal Radio Commission
People from Barbour County, West Virginia
People from Grafton, West Virginia
West Virginia lawyers
West Virginia state senators